Rik de Voest and Izak van der Merwe were the defending champions, but only van der Merwe decided to participate. He played alongside Treat Conrad Huey, but Carsten Ball and Chris Guccione eliminated them already in the first round. Ball and Guccione went on to win the title by defeating Nicholas Monroe and Jack Sock 7–6(7–3), 1–6, [10–5] in the final.

Seeds

Draw

Draw

References
 Main Draw

Natomas Men's Professional Tennis Tournament - Doubles
2011 Doubles